The Phocais was an ancient Greek epic attributed to Homer. In the Life of Homer, a biography of Homer falsely attributed to Herodotus, it was said to have been written while Homer lived at Phocaea with a man named Thestorides; however, whether Thestorides actually existed and where he lived is highly suspect. Like all Homeric works, its true author is unknown; today only a single fragment (three to four sentences of text) claiming its existence survives.

References

Homer
Ancient Greek epic poems
Works of unknown authorship